This is a list of schools (at the elementary and secondary level) that are located in Regina, Saskatchewan, Canada. The three main school divisions encompassing the city are the Regina Board of Education (also known as the Regina public school board; the largest school division in the province), Regina Catholic Schools, the Roman Catholic school board, and the Conseil des Écoles Fransaskoises - also known as CÉF, the provincial Francophone school division. The public system has approximately 21,000 students enrolled across the city; the Catholic board has an enrolment number of approximately 10,000 students; and CÉF has about 500 students in this city. There are also a number of independent schools located in Regina, including  Luther College High School and Regina Christian School.

Historically, the publicly funded separate schools were exclusively for the children of Catholic and Francophone families, who were, by way of ensuring continued support for the separate school system and also as a matter of Catholic doctrine, discouraged from enrolling in the public schools, which were officially secular but which originally maintained a degree of de facto Protestant religious education. Latterly, with a broadly secular ethos having taken hold across Canadian society and the general school population being considerably lower than in the past, enrollment by non-Catholic children in separate schools and by Catholic children in public schools has been less discouraged. This reflects that curricula for all schools in Saskatchewan are set by the provincial department of education, known as Saskatchewan Learning.

Francophone Education in Regina was inaugurated in 1980 when the city's francophone parents opened their own school. In the coming years, they would successfully seek to obtain control of their own school board through the courts, which eventually led to an amended Education Act in 1995 that effectively created a third public and legal entity of education in the province: la Division scolaire francophone No. 310. 

In Saskatchewan, elementary school generally takes place from Kindergarten until completion of Grade 8; education to this level has always been mandatory. Secondary school generally takes place from Grade 9 until completion of Grade 12, with the exception of some schools which offer specialized K-12 programs and alternative schools. With exception to Mother Teresa Middle School in Regina and Sion Middle School in Saskatoon, Saskatchewan has declined to introduce specialized "junior high schools".

The first school opened in Regina in 1883, a year after the city was officially incorporated. It was located in the home of Miss Fanny Laidlaw.

Elementary schools

Public

Catholic

Francophone

High schools

Public

Catholic

Francophone

Independent

Other schools

Public

Catholic

Independent 

Source:

Defunct schools

Elementary schools

Public

Catholic

High schools

Other schools

External links
Regina Public School Division Website
Regina Catholic School Division Website
Conseil des Écoles Fransaskoises Website

References

 List
Regina, Saskatchewan